The term Lombard refers to people or things related to Lombardy, a region in northern Italy.

History and culture 
 Lombards, a Germanic tribe
 Lombards of Sicily, a linguistic minority living in Sicily, southern Italy
 Lombard League, a medieval alliance of some 30 cities in Northern Italy

Businesses 
 ICICI Lombard, an insurance company in India
 Le Lombard (or Editions Lombard), a Belgian comic book publisher
 Lombard Bank, a bank in Malta
 Lombard North Central, a finance house in the United Kingdom

Places 
France
 Lombard, Doubs, a commune of the Doubs département
 Lombard, Jura, a commune of the Jura département
United States
 Lombard, Illinois
 Lombard, Montana
 Lombard, Wisconsin

Other uses 
 Lombard (surname)
 Lombard (gun), an early cannon
 Lombard Street (disambiguation)
 Automobiles Lombard, a French automobile manufacturer in the 1920s
 Lombard Steam Log Hauler
 Lombard language, a Romance language spoken in northern Italy (Lombardy), and in some parts of Switzerland and Brazil
 Lombard, codename of the third generation PowerBook G3 laptop computers made by Apple Computer from 1999 to 2001
 the title character of Anna Lombard, a 1901 novel by Annie Sophie Cory
 Lombard (band), a Polish rock band
 "Lombard" (Miami Vice), an episode from the Miami Vice television series
 Lombard College, a now defunct institution of higher education in Galesburg, Illinois
 Lombard (grape), another name for the German/Italian wine grape Trollinger
 Enfariné noir, French wine grape also known as Lombard
 Lombard (magazine), an Italian business magazine

See also 
 Lombard banking, a form of medieval banking
 Lombard credit, a form of lending used by central banks
 Lombard effect, a phenomenon in which a speaker or singer involuntarily raises his or her vocal intensity in the presence of high levels of sound
 Lombard rhythm, a musical rhythm, especially used in Baroque music
 Lombardo, a family name
 Lombardi (disambiguation)